Cecil Allen Blanchard (17 April 1929 – 25 October 2008) was an Australian federal politician.

Biography
Born in London, England, Blanchard migrated to Australia, where he was educated at the Institute of Technology in Western Australia. He subsequently returned to England for tertiary education at the University of London, and later became a social worker and criminologist, before taking up a post as a training and staff development officer.

In 1983, he was elected to the Australian House of Representatives as the Labor member for the Division of Moore, defeating sitting Liberal member John Hyde. He held the seat until 1990, when a redistribution made his seat marginally Liberal. He opted to run for reelection, and was defeated by Liberal Paul Filing on a swing of six percent.

In 1987 he headed an inquiry into the Aboriginal homelands movement in Australia, by the House of Representatives Standing Committee on Aboriginal Affairs.

References

1929 births
2008 deaths
Australian Labor Party members of the Parliament of Australia
English emigrants to Australia
Members of the Australian House of Representatives for Moore
Members of the Australian House of Representatives
Australian criminologists
Alumni of the University of London
20th-century Australian politicians